Mount Neva is a summit in Grand County, Colorado, in the United States.

Mount Neva was named for Chief Niwot's brother.

Hiking

Mount Neva can be reached from the Fourth of July trailhead west of Nederland, Colorado. The trail is generally rather easy until it reaches Mount Neva's north ridge. Starting at this point, one follows the north ridge to the summit, but this requires long and sustained stretches of class 4 scrambling and climbing on terrain with very substantial vertical exposure.

References

Neva
Neva